The Waltham Petcare Science Institute is the science hub for Mars Petcare, owned by Mars, Incorporated located at Waltham on the Wolds, Leicestershire, United Kingdom. Waltham conducts scientific research into pet care and animal nutrition (for dogs, cats, fish and horses).

History

The pet food subsidiary of Mars, Incorporated (Mars Petcare) began research into pet nutrition in the early 1960s, formally founding a Nutrition Research Unit in 1965. Originally the institute was housed at a nearby location but was moved to an old stud farm at Waltham-on-the-Wolds in 1973.

Since 2001, a non-charitable organisation called the Waltham Foundation has funded a number of humane scientific research projects dedicated to furthering the health and nutrition of companion animals.

An August 2019 documentary on Channel 4 made by Whitworth Media featured the site.

Research

In July 2005, in collaboration with the Monell Chemical Senses Center in Pennsylvania, Waltham discovered that cats cannot taste sweet food because they have a faulty gene. Lions, tigers, leopards and pumas (family Felidae) have the same defective gene.
 In April 2007, in collaboration with the National Human Genome Research Institute of Bethesda, Maryland, Waltham found that the genetic variation of dogs' size is due to mutations in the IGF-1 gene. This was discovered through research on the Portuguese Water Dog. This research was preparatory work for similar studies on the human genome.

Publications

Waltham originally published the magazine Waltham Focus four times a year. This has since been renamed as Veterinary Focus and is distributed in more than fifty countries and is published in several languages.
 The Waltham Book of Companion Animal Nutrition, 15 July 1993, Butterworth–Heinemann, 136pp, 
 The Waltham Book of Human Animal Interaction, 30 September 1995,Butterworth–Heinemann , 148pp,  HC  0-08-042285-3 PB
 Waltham pocket book of essential nutrition for cats and dogs. 2nd edition, 2012 
 Waltham pocket book of human animal interactions, 2012
 Waltham pocket book of puppy nutrition and care, 2012
 Waltham pocket book of healthy weight maintenance for cats and dogs, 2010

Structure
Waltham houses and cares for around 200 dogs and 350 cats. The companion animals involved with the organisation are adopted after a period of time. The UK headquarters of Mars was built next to the Centre in 1981.

There is another research site at Verden an der Aller in north Germany, at Mars Petcare's largest factory in Europe.

References

Further reading

 The Times, 1 November 1997, page 16
 The Independent, 10 June 2001, page 20

External links
 Waltham

Animal health in England
Animal nutrition organizations
Biological research institutes in the United Kingdom
Borough of Melton
Food science institutes
Genetics in the United Kingdom
Genetics or genomics research institutions
Research institutes established in 1973
Research institutes in Leicestershire
1973 establishments in England
Veterinary research institutes
Veterinary medicine in the United Kingdom
Mars, Incorporated